This Changes Everything may refer to:

This Changes Everything (book), a book on global warming and climate change by Naomi Klein,
This Changes Everything (2015 film), a film by Avi Lewis based on the book,
This Changes Everything (2018 film), a film on sexism in Hollywood by Tom Donahue.
 This Changes Everything (album)